Panzer is a Brazilian thrash metal band from São Paulo, formed in the early 1990s. In late 2002, the band released the music video for the song “Fake Game of Heroes”, but some time after, Panzer disbanded due to internal problems. They reformed in 2012, with a new line-up and the websingle "Rising".

Band members
 Edson Graseffi – drums (1991–2002, 2012–present)
 Andre Pars – guitars (1992–2002, 2012–presente)
 Fabiano Menon – bass (2000–2001, 2016–present)
 Sérgio Ogres – vocals (2016–present)

Former members
 Paulo Graseffi – vocals, bass (1991–1997)
 Edson Biza – guitars (1991–1992)
 Élcio Cruz – vocals (1997–2002)
 Jan Leonardi – bass (1997–1999)
 Mauricio Cliff – bass (2002)
 Luiz Scapani – bass (2001, recording of The Strongest)
 Rafael DM – bass (2012–2016)
 Rafael Moreira – vocals (2012–2016)

Discography

Studio albums
 Inside (1999)
 The Strongest (2001)
 Honor (2013)
 Resistance (2016)

Other releases
Thrashed Machine Collection (2007) - Compilation
"Rising" (2012) - Single
Brazilian Threat (2012) - EP
Louder Day After Day – Live Panzer Experience (2015) - DVD/CD

Compilation appearances
Electrical Tribes Vol.II (1996) - "Psycho Order"
The Loudest Times (1999) - "Night Crawler" (Judas Priest cover)
BRazilian Xtreme Way MMXII (2012) - "Red Days"
Upcoming Hell 8 (2012) - "Rising"

References

Brazilian thrash metal musical groups
Brazilian heavy metal musical groups
Musical groups established in 1991
1991 establishments in Brazil
Musical groups from São Paulo